The 2020 Copa do Brasil (officially the Copa Continental Pneus do Brasil 2020 for sponsorship reasons) was the 32nd edition of the Copa do Brasil football competition. It was held between 5 February 2020 and 7 March 2021.

On 15 March 2020, CBF suspended the competition indefinitely due to the COVID-19 pandemic. Four months later, on 9 July 2020, they announced that the tournament would resume on 26 August 2020. The end of the tournament originally scheduled for 16 September 2020 was rescheduled to 17 February 2021, but due to the qualification of the finalist Palmeiras for the 2020 FIFA Club World Cup, the end of the competition was rescheduled again to 7 March 2021.

The competition was contested by 91 teams, either qualified by participating in their respective state championships (70), by the 2020 CBF ranking (10), by the 2019 Copa do Nordeste (1), by the 2019 Copa Verde (1), by the 2019 Série B (1) or those qualified for 2020 Copa Libertadores (8).

Palmeiras defeated Grêmio 3–0 on aggregate in the finals to win their fourth title. As champions, Palmeiras earned the right to play in the 2021 Supercopa do Brasil. They had already qualified for the 2021 Copa Libertadores group stage and the 2021 Copa do Brasil third round by winning the 2020 Copa Libertadores.

Athletico Paranaense were the defending champions, but they were eliminated in the round of 16.

Raphael Veiga (Palmeiras) and Weverton (Palmeiras) won best player and best goalkeeper awards, respectively.

Format
The competition is a single-elimination tournament, the first two rounds were played as a single match and the rest are played as a two-legged ties. Eleven teams entered in the round of 16, which were teams qualified for 2020 Copa Libertadores (8), Série B champions, Copa Verde champions and Copa do Nordeste champions. The remaining 80 teams played in the first round. The 40 winners played the second round, the 20 winners played the third round, and the 10 winners played the fourth round. Finally, the five fourth round winners qualified for the round of 16.

Qualified teams
Teams in bold were qualified directly for the round of 16.

Schedule
The schedule of the competition was as follows:

Draw

First round

Second round

Third round

Fourth round

Final rounds

Bracket

Round of 16

Quarter-finals

Semi-finals

Finals

Top goalscorers

References

 
2020
2020 in Brazilian football
2020 domestic association football cups
Association football events postponed due to the COVID-19 pandemic